Sri Meenakshi Sundareswarar Higher Secondary School, also called SMSV Hr. Sec. School for Boys, is located in Sivan Koil Street, Karaikudi, Tamil Nadu, India. It is one of the oldest schools in Karaikudi .

Notable graduates
Vallal Dr Alagappa Chettiar 
AV Meiyappa Chettiar and more.

References

Boys' schools in India
High schools and secondary schools in Tamil Nadu
Education in Sivaganga district
Karaikudi
Educational institutions established in 1895
1895 establishments in India